"Leysh Nat' Arak" (English: "Why Are We Fighting") is a world music song performed by Belgian singer Natacha Atlas. The song was written by Atlas, Count Dubulah, Hamid ManTu and Attiah Ahlan and produced by Transglobal Underground for the Atlas' debut album Diaspora (1995). 
It was released as a single in 1995. The song was re-recorded and included on the 2005 compilation, The Best of Natacha Atlas.

Background and meaning
"Leysh Nat' Arak" was inspired by ethnic and religious conflicts in Israel, Palestine, Iraq, and Yugoslavia. Written in Arabic, the song calls for peace and unity between Jews, Muslims, and Christians in the Middle East. Furthermore, it addresses Atlas' yearning to understand how and why her family emigrated from the Middle East to Belgium.

Formats and track listings
These are the formats and track listings of major single releases of "Leysh Nat' Arak".

CD single
(NAT40CD; Released 1995)
 "Leysh Nat' Arak" (Radio edit) – 4:11
 "Leysh Nat' Arak" (Nueba mix) – 7:08
 "Leysh Nat' Arak" (FDM mix) – 6:50
 "Duden" – 6:38

12-inch single
(NR40T; Released 1995)
 "Leysh Nat' Arak" (Radio edit) – 4:11
 "Leysh Nat' Arak" (Nueba mix) – 7:08
 "Leysh Nat' Arak" (FDM mix) – 6:50
 "Leysh Nat' Arak" (Amenophis mix) – 6:38

Personnel
The following people contributed to "Leysh Nat' Arak":

Natacha Atlas – lead vocals
Neil Sparkes – goblet drum 
Rafiq Rouissi – goblet drum, riq
Essam Rashad – oud
Larry Whelan – saxophone
Simon Walker – strings

References
General

Specific

External links
Official website

1995 singles
Arabic-language songs
Electronic songs
Natacha Atlas songs
1995 songs